William Betoun or Beaton (died 1620) was a Scottish embroiderer who worked for James VI of Scotland and his wife Anne of Denmark.

On 25 July 1573 Regent Morton appointed Betoun as "browdinstar" to the young king and keeper of his wardrobe. At this time James VI lived at Stirling Castle. Betoun acquired a house in Stirling.

In 1575 Betoun had a servant or assistant embroiderer called George Strathauchin, who was bought clothes by the treasurer. Strathauchin became a tapissier, in charge of maintaining and repairing the royal hangings and tapestries.

Betoun also worked for aristocratic clients, including Lady Ogilvy. He made her a hat string costing £40 Scots to wear at her son's wedding.

James VI had a suite of three green velvet hangings embroidered with gold holly leaves and the Longueville arms, which had belonged to his grandmother Mary of Guise (as Duchess of Longueville by her first marriage). These hangings were delivered to George Strathauchin for repair in 1594 to be displayed at the baptism of Prince Henry. They were repaired again by Nicolas Elsmeere for use during James' return visit to Scotland in 1617. Betoun made coloured velvet cloths to decorate and identify the ambassador's seats in the Chapel Royal during the baptism, and made bonnets for Prince Henry of cloth of gold and cloth of silver.

He married Marion Foulis in August 1597. William Betoun died in July 1620.

References

16th-century Scottish people
1620 deaths
Court of James VI and I
British embroiderers
16th-century Scottish businesspeople
Material culture of royal courts